Kyo Kii... Main Jhuth Nahin Bolta rarely abbreviated as KMJNB is a 2001 Indian Hindi-language fantasy comedy film directed by David Dhawan, starring Govinda, Sushmita Sen, Rambha, Anupam Kher, Satish Kaushik, Mohnish Bahl and Ashish Vidyarthi. It is inspired by the American film Liar Liar (1997).

Plot 
Raj Malhotra is a lawyer, hailing from a small town. He moves to Mumbai to live with his friend Mohan, also a lawyer. Mohan introduces Raj to his life and work. One day, the two attend a criminal case hearing, in which the defence attorney, Tejpal, expertly argues for his client. Tejpal is one of the richest and most successful lawyers in the city. Raj devises a plan to marry into Tejpal's family and become wealthy.

Raj attracts Tejpal's second daughter, Sonam, by making her believe that he is a principled and honest lawyer, who idolises her father. He lies his way into impressing Tejpal himself, who agrees to marry his daughter to Raj. The day after their marriage, Raj is shocked when Sonam insists on moving out of her father's house. She also refuses to take any of her father's money, forcing Raj to move back with Mohan, who wholeheartedly takes them in. 

An underworld don called Kalra, starts seeking a criminal lawyer to defend his brother in a murder trial. Most lawyers are unwilling to take the case, fearing repercussion from Kalra, but Raj grabs the opportunity. He wins the case and Kalra's brother is released. Raj becomes Kalra's permanent attorney, gaining wealth and fame as a result. He and Sonam move into a large house and have a son together. 

Some years later, Kalra's brother is again accused of murder. Sonam wants Raj to fight on behalf of the victim's widow. Raj accepts, but Sonam overhears him promising Kalra to lose the case willingly. Realising that Raj has turned dishonest to make money, Sonam leaves the house and asks for a divorce. 

Raj's son wants his parents back together and makes a wish - he wants his father to stop lying completely. The wish works like a miracle, as the next day, Raj is unable to utter a single falsehood. He ends up tellibg Sonam and Tejpal that he married for money, and cross-examines his own prepared witnesses during Kalra's brother's trial. 

Worried for his life, Raj visits his son and learns of the wish. He asks him to take it back or risk his father being killed by Kalra for losing the case. His son does as told. The miracle is reversed, but Raj has now had a change of heart. He promises his son to continue speaking the truth, and ends up fighting the case against Kalra's brother. He wins, bringing justice to the murdered man's widow. Kalra and his brother are imprisoned, and Sonam returns to Raj's life for keeping his word.

Cast 
 Govinda as Raj Malhotra
 Sushmita Sen as Sonam "Sona" Singh, Tejpal's daughter and Raj's wife
 Rambha as Tara Ahuja, Kalra's assistant with whom Raj has an extramarital affair 
 Satish Kaushik as Mohan Sharma, Raj's friend and also a lawyer, who invites Raj to live with him in his house
 Anupam Kher as Tejpal Singh, a famous and respected lawyer in the city
 Sharad Kapoor as Adarsh, Sonam’s brother-in-law, married to her elder sister
 Ashish Vidyarthi as Kalra, an underworld don who hires Raj to fight his brother's case
 Shahbaz Khan as Vinod, brother to the underworld don Kalra
 Kiran Kumar as Khurana, a businessman who helps Raj secure his first case
 Razzak Khan as Kala Bhai, Kalra's henchman
 Anant Mahadevan as Anand Mhatre, a tenant who is murdered by Vinod for refusing to vacate his landlord's house
 Jaya Bhattacharya as Kavita Mhatre, wife of Anand Mhatre, who is murdered by Vinod
 Mohnish Behl as Rajat Shukla, a journalist who films Anand Mhatre being murdered by Vinod
 Rammohan Sharma as  Mr. Rahul Pange
 Jibraan Khan as Chintu Malhotra, Raj and Sonam's son
 Ghanshyam Rohera as Mishra Khanna
 Shashi Kiran as  Doctor
 Guddi Maruti as Tisha Singh
 Ajit Vachani as Mr. Amit Vachhani
 Anil Nagrath as Judge
 Amit Behl as Doctor
 Mahavir Shah as Public Prosecutor

Soundtrack 
The music has been composed by Anand Raj Anand. Akhlaq Hussain of Planet Bollywood rated the album 7 out of 10.

References

External links 

2001 films
Indian courtroom films
2000s Hindi-language films
Films directed by David Dhawan
Films scored by Anand Raj Anand
2000s fantasy comedy films
Indian fantasy comedy films
Balaji Motion Pictures films
Indian remakes of American films
2001 comedy films